Gorjuša is a small village in the Municipality of Domžale in the Upper Carniola region of Slovenia.

Krumperk Castle stands just south of the settlement.

References

External links 

Gorjuša on Geopedia

Populated places in the Municipality of Domžale